This is a list of Egyptian Writers.

A 
 Hussein Abdelfatah  
 Abaza family
 Fekry Pasha Abaza (1896–1979)
 Abdel Rahman El Abnudi (1938–2015)
 Ahmed Zaki Abu Shadi (1892–1955)
 Yasser Abdel Hafez (1969– )
 Ibrahim Abdel Meguid (1946– )
 Ihsan Abdel Quddous (1919–1990)
 Yahya Taher Abdullah (1938–1981)
 Hamdy Abowgliel
 Yusuf Abu Rayya (1955–2009)
 Tatamkulu Afrika (1920–2002), also connected with South Africa
 Leila Ahmed (1940– )
 Abbas Al Akkad (1889–1964) 
 Jamila al-'Alayili (1907–1991)
 Edwar al-Kharrat (1926–2015)
 Muhammad Aladdin, novelist, short story writer and script writer
 Ahmed Alaidy (1974– )
 Idris Ali (1940–2010)
 Karim Alrawi
 Samir Amin (1931–2018)
 Gaber Asfour (1944–2021)
 Radwa Ashour (1946–2014) 
 Alaa Al Aswany (1957– )
Abdel Rahim Ahmed

B 
 Hala el Badry
 Kerolos Bahgat
 Salwa Bakr
Sherin Hanaey
 Hussein Bassir, archaeologist
 Siham Bayoumi

C 
 Constantine Cavafy
 Andrée Chedid (1920–2011), poet and novelist

E 
 Abo El Seoud El Ebiary (1910–1969)
 Mohammad Elsannour
 Mohamed Osman Elkhosht
 Mansoura Ez Eldin
 Radwa El Aswad

F 
 Fawzia Fahim (1931– )
 Fawziya Mahran (1931–2019)
 Nabil Farouk (1956–2020)

G 
 Fathy Ghanem (1924–1998), novelist, journalist and editor
 Gamal Al-Ghitani (1945–2015)
 Sayed Gouda
 Mohammed Lotfy Gomaa
 Moawad GadElrab

H 
 Mohammad Moustafa Haddara (1930–1997)
 Tawfik El Hakim (1898–1987), playwright
 Yehia Hakki (1905–1992), short-story writer, novelist, critic
 Muhammad Husayn Haykal (1909–1956)
 Ihab Husni (1966– )
 Taha Hussein (1889–1973)

I 
 Hafez Ibrahim (1872–1932)
 Sonallah Ibrahim (1937– )
 Yusuf Idris (1927–1991)

J 

 Edmond Jabès (1912–1991)

K 
Ahmed Kafafi
Ezzat el Kamhawi
Ahmad Al-Khamisi (1948– )
Edwar al-Kharrat (1926–2015)

M 
 Naguib Mahfouz (1911–2006), novelist, short story writer and playwright; awarded the 1988 Nobel Prize in Literature
 Mustafa Mahmud (1921–2009)
 Zaki Naguib Mahmoud (1905–1993) 
 Mustafa Lutfi al-Manfaluti
 Anis Mansour (1925–2011)
 Ibrahim al-Mazini
 Iman Mersal
 Ahmed Mourad
 Salama Moussa (1887–1958)
 Ra'ouf Mus'ad

N 
 Noor Naga
 Nicos Nicolaides
 Naguib Mahfouz

Q 
 Rawhiya al-Qallini
 Abdel Hakim Qasem
 Sayyid Qutb

R 
 Somaya Ramadan (1951– )
 Alifa Rifaat (1930–1996)

S 
 Nawâl El Saadâwi (1931–2021), feminist writer and activist
 Mekkawi Said (1956–2017), novelist and short story writer
 Salama Ahmed Salama (1932–2012), journalist and author
 Ibtihal Salem  (1949–2015), short story writer, novelist and translator
 Muhammad Jamal Saqr (1966–), poet
 Khairy Shalaby (1938–2011), novelist and author
 Ahmed Shawqi (1868–1932), poet laureate
 Gilbert Sinoué (1947–), guitarist and author
 Laila Soliman (1981–), playwright
 Ahdaf Soueif (1950–), novelist and political and cultural commentator

T 
 Miral al-Tahawy
 Bahaa Taher
 Ahmed Khaled Tawfik (1962–2018)
 Sahar Tawfiq
Sherin Hanaey
 Aisha Taymur
 May Telmissany
 Munira Thabit (1902–1967), first woman lawyer in Egypt, journalist and writer
 Affaf Tobbala (1941– )
 Ahmad Khaled Towfeq

V 
 Mireille Vincendon (1910–), French-language poet and writer

Z 

 Amina Zaydan (1966– )
 May Ziadeh (1886–1941)
 Youssef Ziedan (1958– )

See also
 List of African writers by country
 List of Egyptian-American writers

References 

Egyptian writers
Egyptian
Writers, List of